Lukáš Dlouhý and Leander Paes were the defending champions, but chose not to participate together.
Dlouhý competed together with Paul Hanley, however they lost to Jürgen Melzer and Philipp Petzschner in the second round.
Paes partnered up with Mahesh Bhupathi and they won this tournament, defeating Max Mirnyi and Daniel Nestor 6–7(5), 6–2, [10–5] in the final.

Seeds

Draw

Finals

Top half

Bottom half

References
 Main Draw

2011 ATP World Tour
2011 Sony Ericsson Open
Men in Florida